Heinz-Peter Uberjahn (born 13 November 1948 in Germany) is a German football manager who last worked as head coach of the Namibia national football team.

Career

Uberjahn managed the Niger national football team, and after that, he coached the Burkina Faso national football team. In 1999, he was appointed head coach of the Namibia national football team, a position he held until 1999.

References

External links 
 The brown broth of the Marabu
 236 international matches in 36 countries
 German coaches laid the foundation stone in Africa 
 33 years as a trainer and sports development assistant in Africa: Peter Ueberjahn. Trainer-Globetrotter Ueberjahn 
 First honor, then success

Living people
1948 births
German football managers
German expatriate football managers
Niger national football team managers
Burkina Faso national football team managers
Namibia national football team managers
German expatriate sportspeople in Namibia
Expatriate football managers in Namibia
West German expatriate sportspeople in Niger
Expatriate football managers in Niger
West German expatriate sportspeople in Burkina Faso
Expatriate football managers in Burkina Faso
West German football managers
West German expatriate football managers
People from Velbert
Sportspeople from Düsseldorf (region)